Sophie Wright may refer to:
 Sophie B. Wright (1866–1912), New Orleans educator
 Sophie Wright (actress) (born 1990), Australian actress
 Sophie Wright (Emmerdale), fictional character on British TV show Emmerdale in 1996–1997
 Sophie Wright (chef), British chef
 Sophie Wright (cyclist) (born 1999), British cyclist